K. Lalrinliana is an Indian politician who is serving as Member of Mizoram Legislative Assembly and Minister of State for Food, Civil Supplies & Consumer Affairs, LAD, Fisheries in Government of Mizoram during Third Zoramthanga ministry.

Personal life 
He was born in January 1, 1960 in Kolasib to K. Thanhawla. In September 28, 2021, he was tested positive for COVID-19.

References 

Mizoram MLAs 2018–2023
Mizo National Front politicians

1960 births
Living people